Stoke-on-Trent North is a constituency represented in the House of Commons of the UK Parliament since 2019 by Jonathan Gullis, a member of the Conservative Party.

Members of Parliament

Constituency profile
The area has relatively fast connections compared to other seats in the county, equally to Greater Manchester and the West Midlands. However, the area's traditional pottery industry has shed many jobs.
Workless claimants, registered jobseekers, were in November 2012 higher than the national average of 3.8%, at 5.2% of the population based on a statistical compilation by The Guardian, the middle figure of the three rates for the city's seats.

Boundaries

Each of the three constituencies of Stoke-on-Trent contain two of the historic "six towns" of the Potteries. Burslem and Tunstall are Stoke-on-Trent North's long-established ceramics and porcelain settlements; see Staffordshire Potteries.

2010–present: The City of Stoke-on-Trent wards of Burslem North, Burslem South, Chell and Packmoor, East Valley, Norton and Bradeley, and Tunstall, and the Borough of Newcastle-under-Lyme wards of Butt Lane, Kidsgrove, Ravenscliffe, and Talke.

1997–2010: The City of Stoke-on-Trent wards of Burslem Central, Burslem Grange, Chell, East Valley, Norton and Bradeley, and Tunstall North, and the District of Staffordshire Moorlands wards of Brown Edge and Endon, and Stanley.

1983–1997: The City of Stoke-on-Trent wards of Burslem Central, Burslem Green, Chell, East Valley, Norton and Bradeley, and Tunstall North, and the Borough of Newcastle-under-Lyme wards of Butt Lane, Kidsgrove, Newchapel, and Talke.

1955–1983: The County Borough of Stoke-on-Trent wards numbers 1, 2, 3, 4, 5, 6, 7, and 8.
1950–1955: The County Borough of Stoke-on-Trent wards numbers 1, 2, 3, 4, 5, 6, 7, 8, 9, and 27.

History
This constituency was formed in 1950, at which time it incorporated parts of the former Leek and Hanley seats.

Prominent members
As a frontbench member in government, John Forrester became in 1970 a Health Minister, before the election of that year.

Elections

Elections in the 2010s

Elections of the 2000s

Elections of the 1990s

Elections of the 1980s

Elections of the 1970s

Elections of the 1960s

Elections of the 1950s

See also
List of parliamentary constituencies in Staffordshire
Edward Kenealy

Notes

References

Parliamentary constituencies in Staffordshire
Politics of Stoke-on-Trent
Constituencies of the Parliament of the United Kingdom established in 1950
Politics of the Borough of Newcastle-under-Lyme